The Hogeschool van Amsterdam, University of Applied Sciences (HvA), or Amsterdam University of Applied Sciences (AUAS), is a large institute for higher professional education in the Netherlands, established in 1993. The HvA mainly offers bachelor's degree programmes, but also has a number of (professional) master's degree programmes. For students from the HvA's international partner institutes it is possible to study at the HvA as an exchange student.

The HvA offers eighty courses of study, spread across locations in Amsterdam. 
The university maintains ties with the University of Amsterdam. The HvA's 2,300 employees serve more than 40,000 students.

An important way of learning is via work placements. All students at the HvA have a practical work period in order to get on-the-job experience in the field of their study. Such a work placement can be at a company or organisation in the Netherlands or abroad. Most of the teaching at the HvA is organised in modules, which are given in four periods of ten weeks or in two semesters.

Training
The HvA has 90 college programmes divided and grouped into seven 'domains' (faculties).

23 of these programmes are accredited by the NVAO. Besides full-time programmes, the college also has some part-time courses.

Programs classified into Domain:

Exercise, Sports and Nutrition
 Physical education
 Sport, Management and Entrepreneurship
 Nutrition and Dietetics

Economics and Management
 Accountancy
 Business Informatics
 Commercial Economy
 Business Economics for Future Entrepreneurs
 Communications
 Financial Services Management
 Fiscal Economics
 Human Resource Management
 International Management (English)
 International Business and Languages (English and International)
 International Business and Management Studies (international and English)
 Logistics and Economics
 Management, Economics and Law
 Management in Health Care and Social Services
 Small Business and Retail Management
 Sports Marketing
 Trade Management Asia (English)

Health
 Nursing
 Social Psychiatric Nurse
 Occupational Therapy
 Physiotherapy
 Exercise
 European Master of Science in Occupational Therapy (international and English)
 European School of Physiotherapy (international and English)
 Master Evidence Based Practice

Social Work and Law
 Social Work and Community Services
 Cultural and Social Education
 Social Educational Care Work
 Legal Studies
 Social Legal Studies
 Applied Psychology
 Public Management

Digital Media and Creative Industry
 Fashion & Branding (also in English version)
 Fashion and Design (also in English version)
 Fashion & Management (in English version)
 Informatics
 Computer Science
 Information Engineering
 Communication & Multimedia Design
 Media, Information and Communication
 Game Development
Digital Design

Education and Parenting
 Higher Education Executive training
 PABO (Primary school teacher)
 Pedagogy
 International Degree in English and Education (international and English)
 Geography Teacher
 Biology Teacher
 Architecture Teacher
 Building Technology Teacher
 Consumption Technology Teacher
 Economics Teacher
 Electrical teacher
 English teacher
 French Teacher
 History Teacher
 Teacher Health and Welfare
 Teacher Grafimedia
 Social Studies Teacher
 Teacher Mechanical Engineering
 Automotive Technology Teacher
 Teacher Physics-Chemistry
 Dutch teacher
 Teacher Education
 Teacher Technology
 Mechanical Teacher
 Mathematics Teacher
 Master Teacher of Economics
 Master English Teacher
 French Master Teacher
 Master Teacher History
 Dutch Master Teacher
 Master Mathematics Teacher
 Primary Teacher

Technology
 Aviation Studies
 Aviation Engineering 
 Aviation Logistics
 Business Mathematics
 Engineering
 Structural Business (Property Studies)
 Business Logistics
 Civil Engineering
 E-technology
 Engineering, Design and Innovation
 Forensic Investigation
 Human Logistics
 Maritime Officer
 Entrepreneurship, Innovation and Technology
 Product Design
 Industrial Engineering

References

External links
 Hogeschool van Amsterdam – University of Applied Sciences

Vocational universities in the Netherlands
Schools in Amsterdam